The 1936 International Lawn Tennis Challenge was the 31st edition of what is now known as the Davis Cup. Due to the low number of competing South American teams, the North & Central America and South America Zones were scrapped and the Americas played in one unified zone. From this edition, the Qualifying Round system of the Europe Zone was scrapped. 19 teams entered the Europe Zone (including Argentina, the only South American team to enter), while 4 teams entered the Americas Zone.

Australia defeated the United States in the Americas Zone final, while in the Europe Zone final Germany defeated Yugoslavia. The Australians then defeated Germany in the Inter-Zonal play-off, but would fall to Great Britain in the Challenge Round. The final was played at the All England Club Centre Court in Wimbledon, London, England on 25–28 July.

America Zone

Draw

Final
United States vs. Australia

Europe Zone

Draw

Final
Yugoslavia vs. Germany

Inter-Zonal Final
Australia vs. Germany

Challenge Round
Great Britain vs. Australia

See also
 1936 Wightman Cup

References

External links
Davis Cup official website

Davis Cups by year
 
International Lawn Tennis Challenge
International Lawn Tennis Challenge
International Lawn Tennis Challenge
International Lawn Tennis Challenge